Mounir Boukadida (born 24 October 1967 in Sousse) is a former Tunisian football defender.

He was a member of the Tunisian national team at the 1998 FIFA World Cup. His only goal for the national team was in 1996 in a friendly match against Egypt.

His daughter Myriem is a model for the fashion brand Guess.

References

External links
 

1967 births
Living people
Tunisian footballers
1998 FIFA World Cup players
Tunisia international footballers
Tunisian expatriate footballers
Étoile Sportive du Sahel players
SV Waldhof Mannheim players
Tunisian Ligue Professionnelle 1 players
2. Bundesliga players
1994 African Cup of Nations players
1996 African Cup of Nations players
2000 African Cup of Nations players
2002 African Cup of Nations players
Expatriate footballers in Germany
People from Sousse
Association football defenders